S. R. Chishti is a tabla player of Lucknow gharana (tabla) and composer.  S R Chishti completed his PhD from Dr. B. R. Ambedkar University, Agra in music (Tabla).

Career
He is music (tabla) instructor at Cultural Education Center, Aligarh Muslim University, Aligarh and authored Fun-e-Tabla the first ever book on the art of playing Tabla in Urdu language after 1906. He has various books on the different topics of Tabla.

Published books
He has published five books so far, which include:
 Fan-E-Tabla (Urdu) published in 2011
 Tabla Sanchayan (Hindi) published in 2012
 Tabla Mein Das Anko Ka Mahetv (Hindi) published in 2013
 Bhartiye Talon Mein Theke Ke Vibhinn Sworoop (Hindi) published in 2014
 Compositions of The Great Tabla Maestros (English)

Awards and honors
Regular ‘B-High’ grade artist of AIR Agra since 1995
Honored by Swami D. R. Pavertikar Sangeet Sansthan, Mathura in 2004
Given estimation and prestigious judgment for various musical competitions
Tabla concert in “SPIC-MACAY”, “TAJ MAHOTSAV”, LUCKNOW MAHOTSAV” and Governor House Lucknow

Views
Khalifa Ustad Afaq Husain Khan (Tabla Maestro, Lucknow Gharana)

Ustad Shafi Ahmad Khan (Vocalist), Sangeet Research Academy, ITC, Kolkata

References

External links
Lucknow gharana (tabla)

Living people
1965 births
Tabla players
Hindustani instrumentalists
Indian male classical musicians
People from Faizabad
Chishtis